Mountain Metropolitan Transit is the public transportation operator for the metro area of Colorado Springs, Colorado, providing service to downtown Colorado Springs and surrounding areas within city limits and to the city of  Manitou Springs, Widefield and Security. It has 27 local routes.

Services 
Currently, Metro offers bus service to about 70% of the city Monday-Saturday, plus limited weekday evening and Sunday service.
For more information on the routes (& other offerings) servicing the Colorado Springs metropolitan vicinity via Mountain Metro Transit:

History

Before Mountain Metropolitan Transit 
Prior to Mountain Metropolitan Transit's launch on Thursday, November 2, 2005, the city of Colorado Springs had a transit system called Springs Transit.  It was a service that had Weekday services, Saturday service (implemented in 1989), & Evening Service (implemented in 1992).  The system used to span the city between Chapel Hills in the north to Widefield in the south, Manitou Springs in the west to Peterson AFB to the east, and much in between.  The Downtown Terminal was the primary hub and every bus went to the Terminal (with the exception of the Route 5 – Eastern Crosstown, which used the Citadel as the primary transfer hub).  The alternative main transfer points were The Citadel (#1, 2, 4, & 5) & PPCC (#2, 5, & 9).  The color scheme was a sky blue with "Clean Air: It's Up To Us!" as their slogan.  The signage at stops were a huge CS Transit logo that looked like a transit bus.

In 1992, there were 10 routes which were: (* indicates the route with the new evening services) 
Route 1 – North Academy* / Manitou* 
Route 2 – Fort Carson* / Peterson AFB 
Route 3 – Cascade*  
Route 4 – Wahsatch / Broadmoor 
Route 5 – Eastern Crosstown*  
Route 6 – Rustic Hills / West Uintah 
Route 7 – Hillside / Constitution 
Route 8 – Eastborough / Holland Park 
Route 9 – Widefield 
No Number – Union Express.

The route brochures were color coded & had both routes listed and was really simple to use.  There was also a newspaper sized foldout that had the system map on the front, routes timetables listed inside, & the new Evening Service map/schedule combo on the back, simply easy to use.  The fleet was aging, with most buses from the 1970s (see bus fleet grid below), the city bought 14 new Gillig buses, 1673–1684 Gillig Phantom's & 1617–1618 Gillig Spirit's, which helped with the new Evening Service implements.

In 1994, Springs Transit bought 10 new Gillig Phantom's 1685–1694, which were the first buses in Colorado Springs that had "working" Air Conditioning units, since the 1979 GMC RTS buses AC units were not fully functional due to a design flaw.

In 1995 & 1997, many routes were changed & a few were completely decommissioned during the service changes of those years.  The routes were still interlined except they were given their own route numbers with a 1 in front (example: Route 11 – Manitou, etc.), and they introduced a more flimsy brochure with useless repetitive rules & information listed on each one. There were a couple of new routes including the Cheyenne Mountain Zoo extension to the Broadmoor route, Colorado Springs Airport saw 8 trips per weekday, and the 6-West Uintah & 9-Widefield routes were eliminated.  Also, Springs Transit bought another 8 buses (9701-9708), 30' New Flyer Low Floors.  In 1997, Springs Transit changed their color from sky blue to a burgundy wiggly stripe & the removal of the "Clean Air" campaign & logos.

In 1997, the routes & services were altered massively.  Evening Services were changed frequently to try to fine tune ridership needs.  The routes were still interlined, yet the numbering was changed to avoid confusion. The conversion of the curtain destination signs to digital made it much easier to make this happen.
The 1997 routes offered were:  
Route 1 – North Academy  
Route 2 – Fort Carson  
Route 3 – Cascade  
Route 4 – Wahsatch  
Route 5 – Eastern Crosstown (Citadel/PPCC) 
Route 6 – Rustic Hills (Services were chopped from going to Hathaway to Paonia) 
Route 6 – West Uintah – ELIMINATED (Merged with Route 11 to form 11B AKA 11U)  
Route 7 – Hillside (7A-Ran the Winnipeg/Tahoe while 7B-Ran the Parkside/International)  
Route 8 – Eastborough  
Route 9 – Widefield – ELIMINATED  
Route 11 – A-Manitou/B-30th (11A AKA 11M ran to Manitou 11 times per day while 11B-Ran the 30th St.)  
Route 12 – Peterson AFB  
Route 14 – Broadmoor  
Route 15 – Eastern Crosstown (Citadel/East Library)  
Route 17 – Constitution  
Route 18 – Holland Park  
Route 21 – South Academy *NEW ROUTE* (Services between The Citadel and PPCC running every 70 mins.) 
Route 27 – Gateway Park (Similar to Hillside, departed the Terminal at :15 after the 7A departed) 
Route 27 – Las Vegas/CJC (The replacement for Gateway Park route after its demise from low ridership) 
Route 71 – Fountain  
Route 91 – Union Express

Springs Transit bought 21 Gillig Phantom's in 1999 (9901-9921), 5 more in 2001 (0101-0105), & 2 more in 2002 (0206-0207).  Also bought were 3 Nova RTS buses (0201-0203) for the new Route 94-Monument Express.  Also, Springs Transit purchased two Gillig Low Floors (0208-0209) and two ElDorado National Aerotech cutaways (0204-0205).
The services would be modified & altered over the years, until the voters approved of the new PPRTA tax in Nov. 2004 to improve roads & help to fund the transit system.  This would pave the way for what would soon be known as Mountain Metropolitan Transit a.k.a. Metro.
And finally, on Wednesday, November 1, 2005, the final evening buses pulled out of the Terminal (& The Citadel Transfer Station), concluding decades of service under the name Springs Transit.

2005: Dawn Of A New Era 
On November 2, 2005, Metro began bus service where Springs Transit left off the previous night.  It also introduced bus service on Sundays for the first time in Colorado Springs Transit history.  A lack of Sunday bus service was a common complaint among riders.  And it also added evening service for Saturdays as well, also a common complaint.  Evening service was also expanded to include more routes.  Sunday service was hourly and used the same routes that ran evening service.

2006–2008: Better years for MMT 
By early 2006, the number of transfer stations increased from two (Downtown Terminal and Citadel Mall) to eleven stations throughout the city (UCCS, Chapel Hills Mall, Austin Bluffs/Academy, First & Main Town Center, PPCC Centennial Campus, Hancock Plaza, etc.).  This allowed more direct bus service and allowed more routes to be created that didn't have to go to the Downtown Terminal to transfer.  For example, when Springs Transit, there were two routes running on Academy Blvd., Route 1 – North Academy ran on the north part of Academy and Route 21 – South Academy ran on the south part.  That was reduced to just one route (#25) running the length of Academy Blvd. from Chapel Hills Mall to PPCC.  It added more frequency to South Academy section from its original 70 minutes to 35 minutes.

Frequency on weekdays for the most popular routes was 35 minutes.  Medium ridership routes ran every 35 minutes during the peak hours, and during the off-peak hours they ran every 70 minutes.  And lower ridership routes was operating every 70 minutes.  Frequency on evenings and Sundays ran every 60 minutes.  Frequency on Saturdays was 35 minutes for routes 3, 5, and 25.  The other routes ran every 70 minutes.  Evening service ran Monday through Saturday.

In 2007, seasonal bus service to the Cheyenne Mountain Zoo was added.  It ran from Memorial Day to Labor day, but only ran on weekends.  Also, a couple of new express routes were added.  The first one (route E-4), serviced the north section of the Powers corridor and the Northgate area.  The second one (route 94), provided service to Schriever AFB from Fountain & Security/Widefield.

All routes were changed to run on the current 30 and 60-minute headways in the fall of 2008 after the debut of the Ute Pass Express.  The frequency changes required that most of the routes be shortened slightly so that on-time performance would not suffer.  By the time the frequency changes were in place, route 15 was revised to allow for improved service. Also, a new route was created (Route 16 – Brookside St) that replaced route 32 (Uintah Gardens) and ran the 32's route, plus it extended the route to the downtown terminal (which the Route 32 did not serve).  Route 6 was altered to allow service to Fillmore and 4th Street from the downtown terminal.  As a result, Route 6 no longer operated on Van Buren & Mann Middle School. Route 20 also no longer served those areas as it was revised to stay on Circle Drive past Union where Circle turned into Fillmore.  Also, Route 9 would see its first real change in decades (including S.T. days), it was pulled from Winters/El Paso & 4th/Hancock portions to go directly along Mountview instead. Route 9 was also extended to serve the Woodmen Park and Ride and the Chapel Hills Mall, which allowed off-peak and Saturday service to the former.  Route 25 lost its north end routing and was given to the newly extended Route 9.  By this time, Routes 7 and 14 were running every 30 minutes all day, including Saturdays.  Route 31 got a frequency increase to 60 minutes.  Routes 13 and 19 were left unchanged as they only ran on evenings and Sundays.  All the specialty routes and most of the express routes were also unchanged.  Route E-1 (Union Town Center Express) lost service north of Research Pkwy.

2009: Financial Decline 
Colorado Springs was deeply affected by the budget crisis.  In January 2009, the fare increased from $1.50 to $1.75.  In April 2009, several routes were eliminated, which included Route 20 (Circle-UCCS), and Route 21 (Murray/Tutt). Route 23 (Constitution/Oro Blanco) was altered to merge Route 21 & 23 into 1 route, operating between The Citadel & East Library via Murray, 1st & Main Town Center & Barnes/Austin Bluffs (The route would later be eliminated as well by the end of 2009). All express routes not serving Schriever Air Force Base were eliminated (E1, E2, E3, and E4).  All specialty routes were gone, which included school trippers (Routes 41-43), Shopper's Special (Route 40), and Route 17 (Cheyenne Mountain Zoo). At least six transfer stations were closed.  In addition, Routes 6, 8, 12, 15, and 24 began running hourly all-day instead of 30 minute peak-hour service and 60 minute off-peak service.  Routes 12 and 22 no longer operated on evenings and Sundays.  Route 2 (Printers Pkwy-Hancock Plaza) was eliminated. Route 1 (Hillside-Hancock Plaza), which ran on most of the same streets as route 2, got a frequency increase to 30 minutes.  Due to the elimination of both dedicated evening/Sunday routes (#13 & #19), routes 5, 9 and 14 began running evenings and Sundays, although the latter two only ran part of their route on evenings and Sundays.  The free downtown shuttle (DASH) no longer ran on Saturdays, but within a month, it was eliminated altogether due to lack of funding.

During this year, Mountain Metropolitan Transit received $8.8 million in ARRA funds.  This money is being used for many things, such as allowing subcontractors to provide bus service, preventative maintenance, a new transit facility, 29 new paratransit vehicles (for Mountain Metro Mobility), three new service support vehicles (Supervisors & relief drivers), security cameras installation on the buses, and more improvements to the downtown terminal.

2010: Financial Downward Turn 
All evening and weekend bus services were terminated on January 1, 2010 (this would be the 1st time since Springs Transit introduced the services in March 1992), along with the elimination of route 30 (Fort Carson), and the Schriever AFB express routes (92, 93, and 95) due to the failure of 2C among voters. As a result, from January 1, 2010 to March 7, 2011, Colorado Springs was the largest city in the United States that had no public transit service on weekends.  Route 14, a higher volume route, had its frequency cut from 30 minutes to 60 minutes. Many riders believe this was a major mistake, as it caused the route to become overcrowded during certain parts of the day, especially after the Department of Human Services (DHS) & the Pikes Peak Workforce Center were relocated to their current locations on Garden Of The Gods Rd. near Centennial.

2011: Lost Services Regained 
It was announced that partial weekend service would return for 2011 due to the city's budget being higher than expected. On March 12, 2011, Saturday service was added to nine routes.
 1 – Hillside – Hancock Plaza
 3 – Colorado Ave. - Manitou Springs
 5 – Boulder Ave. - Citadel
 7 – Pikes Peak Ave. - Citadel
 9 – Cascade Ave. - UCCS (No service north of UCCS)
 11 – World Arena – PPCC
 12 – Palmer Park – Space Center/Powers
 14 – Garden Of The Gods Rd – Austin Bluffs & Academy
 25 – Academy Blvd.
All routes run at hourly intervals.  While the services regained were nowhere near as prosperous as when Metro began in 2005 (nor in its Springs Transit days where only the express routes did not run on Saturday), it was very much welcomed.

On October 31, 2011, the service for Ute Pass Express, which was an express service for the city of Woodland Park, Colorado, was cut due to the federal grant expiring & low ridership.

2012: More Positive Restoration 
For the start of the 2012 year, it was proposed to test the feasibility of smaller buses for low-ridership routes. This would remove the normal 35 foot Gillig Phantoms and Gillig BRT's, to a 16-passenger cutaway bus. These were tested on routes 15, 16, 22, and 24.

On April 2, 2012, route 31 was eliminated due to the city of Fountain, Colorado not contracting with Mountain Metropolitan Transit any longer since the City of Fountain began their own transit service.

Also, Mountain Metropolitan Transit split Route 22 (which also ran into Fountain near Fountain Mesa & Mesa Ridge) into two different routes. Route 22 was changed from running its normal route, and started to run the south part of Colorado Springs under a new route known as Southborough. The new Route 32, however, will run most of the normal Route 22, but will not continue to the city of Fountain.  This move also reduced Metro Mobility paratransit services from providing services into Fountain as well. Along with these spring changes, its ADA paratransit (Metro Mobility) has increased its fare from $0.36 a mile to $0.38 a mile.

The changes also changed the direction of Route 14, although no riders were directly affected. The change was to accommodate a new ridership pattern and the relocation of the El Paso County Human Services offices.

Finally, Front Range Express (FREX) had its final service to and from Denver on August 31, 2012.  The popular service was decommissioned due to the city of Colorado Springs pulling its funding for the service.  One of the reasons FREX was eliminated was to help restore the local bus service.

2013: The Return of Evening Services 
On April 1, 2013, some evening service returned to the city. These Routes include:
 1 – Hillside – Hancock Plaza
 3 – Colorado Ave. - Manitou Springs
 5 – Boulder St. - Citadel
 7 – Pikes Peak Ave – Citadel
 9 – Cascade – UCCS
 11 – World Arena – PPCC
 25 – Academy Blvd.

The restored evening services were not to the levels of earlier Metro days (less routes & no Saturday evenings) or even Springs Transit days as before the service cuts, evening bus service stopped at 11 PM, versus 10 PM nowadays.  It was a major relief to have it back among riders.  The final #25 bus meets the last buses arriving at The Citadel. Route 25's last departure from the Citadel is at 9:44 PM.  One additional trip was added to Route 10, leaving the Downtown Terminal at 6:45 PM and terminating at PPCC at 7:08 PM.

Also on April 1, 2013, Route 14 received some minor schedule changes to reduce delays caused by large numbers of people boarding at Garden Of The Gods & Centennial at certain times of the day.

On May 19, 2013, the restored free shuttle service began in Manitou Springs. The shuttle runs along Manitou Avenue and connect the Cog Railway and Manitou Incline along Ruxton Avenue. It runs daily (including Sundays and holidays) from 6 AM to 6 PM during the summer months.  Service frequency is 20 minutes from 6 AM to 8 AM, and 30 minutes afterwards.  This service is expected to resume next Spring.

On September 8, 2013, bus stop standardization was implemented on routes 1, 3, 5, and 25 to help with on-time performance.  The process removed and relocated numerous bus stops along those routes, changing the distance between stops to be about 1300 feet (estimated from every 2 blocks to almost every 4 blocks).  A new transfer station was built two blocks north of the Chapel Hills Mall on Voyager Pkwy, and buses that terminated at Chapel Hills Mall now terminate here instead.  The change was made to prevent buses from having to enter the Chapel Hills Mall parking lot to service the mall, which can get crowded during the holiday shopping season.

That same day, Route 14 was extended (no longer serving the Morning Sun Transfer Station, one of the original major Metro Transfer Stations near Austin Bluffs & Academy) to Barnes & Oro Blanco, providing service to Doherty High School on Barnes Road for the first time since the 2009 service cuts (which eliminated the Route 23).  Unfortunately, the extension had a negative effect to on-time performance due to the route's hourly headway and many of the route's riders boarding and alighting at the Citizen's Service Center on Garden of the Gods Rd.  Saturday on-time performance was not affected.

2014: The Return Of Sunday Service & More Changes 

On March 30, 2014, some major service changes took place, including the much anticipated return of Sunday service.  The Sunday routes are the same as the evening routes (1, 3, 5, 7, 9B, 11, and 25). Buses operate on Sundays between 7:45 AM to 5:45 PM, which were the 2009 Sunday service hours.  In addition, there is Sunday-level bus services for the spring and summer holidays (Memorial Day, Independence Day, and Labor Day). However, there is no bus service for the fall and winter holidays (Thanksgiving Day, Christmas Day, and New Year's Day).

Also, Route 9 was split into 2 routes 9A and 9B.  This is a practice that was used by Springs Transit that Metro did not use for some reason, until now.  Route 9A will run the whole route, while 9B only operates between Downtown and UCCS.  Route 9A has evening service with a 7:15PM terminal departure, while route 9B will depart the terminal during the rest of evening service & operates on weekends.

Route 14 is making news again, as it was chopped into 2 separate routes to "allow for better on-time performance".  Route 14 would service between the Terminal and Garden Of The Gods Road and the El Paso County Department Of Human Services aka Citizens Center.  The route was rerouted from Vondelpark and Centennial to Forrest Hill.  It still ran hourly, although there was a proposal to increase its headway to 30 minutes in the near future.  The east-west portion of the route from Garden of the Gods Rd to Austin Bluffs & Barnes is now numbered as route 34 and it runs on Weekdays & Saturdays. Route 14 lost Saturday service which negatively impacted everyone living near the route.  Route 34 does run on Saturday, but only from 6-10 AM and from 2:30-7 PM.  The cuts to Saturday service will likely only be temporary as there are plans to restore full Saturday service in the near future as soon as the budget allows for it.  Unfortunately, route 14's on-time performance suffered heavily due to remaining on an hourly headway and the high number of people boarding/alighting at the north end of the route.

Another new route added allows service to part of the Powers corridor. It will allow service between the Citadel and Barnes Rd.  It will be an hourly route running all-day Monday-Friday from Platte and Powers to Barnes, and will service Tutt Blvd between Barnes and Constitution.  There is also a stop at Space Center Drive to allow transfers to Route 12.  As a result, Security Service Field and the First and Main Town Center will once again have bus service.  The route is known as route 23 (which is the route number of an old route that was cut in April 2009)

On May 6, 2014, taking a suggestion, Metro announced another new route, Route 2.  It provides service to the brand new VA clinic at the corner of Fillmore & Centennial and it also services the Citizen's Service Center, complementing Route 14. It will service some of route 14's stops, mainly Chestnut St. from Fontanero to Fillmore, and Garden of the Gods Road from Centennial to near 30th St.  It departs from the Downtown Terminal at :45 starting at 7:45 AM running on weekdays, allowing a 30-minute headway to the Citizen's Service Center, reducing overcrowding and "improving" route 14's on-time performance. Route 2 started service on Monday, May 19.  Initial hours were from 7:45 AM – 11 AM and 2 PM – 4:30 PM with no midday service.  Route 2's hours were changed to 10:45 AM – 4:31 PM on June 23, 2014 to better coincide with route 14's peak boarding hours to increase ridership and improve route 14's on-time performance.  To encourage ridership, all rides on route 2 from June 23 to July 23 were free.  The fall 2014 service changes involved Route 2 becoming a permanent route, with hours being expanded to 7:45 AM – 5:31 PM on weekdays and added Saturday service from 7:15 AM – 5 PM.

2015–2017: System Restructure & Service Expansion 

In April 2015, the system began to be restructured into an H-network to improve connections and ridership. Route 22 was restructured to service a portion of Route 7's service area. Route 23 was restructured to accommodate most of route 24's service area  and a portion of Route 34's service area as the former route was eliminated due to low ridership and the latter was shortened.

Metro introduced 15-minute service on Route 5, the first time the transit agency has ever done so on a non-shuttle route.  The increase in frequency made it necessary for Route 7 to be shortened so both routes could operate without being interlined like they were from 2008–2014.  Route 5 continued to run hourly on weekday evenings and on weekends.  Metro has plans to introduce 15-minute service on additional routes in the future as funding allows.

Saturday service saw an expansion, with Routes 4, 6, and 8 gaining Saturday service for the first time since the 2010 service cuts. In addition, Route 34 began operating all-day on Saturdays.

A few service changes were made to improve on-time performance on certain routes.  Routes 1 and 3 were no longer interlined, although Route 1 is still interlined with Route 32.  Routes 14 and 34 were interlined to improve the former route's on-time performance.  Route 25 was split into two routes; Route 25 and Route 27, due to poor on-time performance on weekday afternoons and on weekends. Routes 25 and 27 remained interlined for weekday service until 1 PM, when the routes start to operate alone and an additional bus is added to Route 25.  For weekday evening and weekend service, Route 25 is interlined with Route 5, and Route 27 is interlined with Route 7.

A few necessary changes were made on May 17 to address on-time issues caused by the new service changes.  Route 3 saw schedule changes, and Route 22 was restructured to remain on Murray between Galley and Fountain.

Additional service additions were made on September 13, 2015, with the addition of weekday evening and Saturday service to routes 22 and 23 due to a major ridership increase on both routes, and the latter route providing service to lot of retail stores.  In addition, Routes 5 and 25 got a frequency increase to 30 minutes on Saturdays to improve ridership on-time performance and reduce overcrowding on those routes, especially Route 5.  Routes 9A and 9B were renumbered so that the south part of the route would be numbered as Route 9 and the north portion as Route 39.  This was necessary as the electronic systems Metro uses do not recognize letters in route numbers.

On May 1, 2016, much of the system saw a major restructure to reduce circuitous routing and service duplication.  Route 3 was shortened to terminate at Old Man's Trail to improve on-time performance.  This made it necessary to run Route 33 year-round to provide service to Ruxton, which also allowed year-round service to the Manitou Incline and the COG Railway.  Route 6 was changed to terminate at Cascade & Fillmore instead of the Downtown Terminal.  Routes 8 and 12 were changed to terminate at Nevada & Cache La Poudre.  Route 15 was split into two routes.  The new route 15 provides service between Rio Grande & Nevada and the Cheyenne Mountain Shopping Center.  A new route, route 35, was created to serve the portion of the old 15 between the Criminal Justice Center and the PPCC transfer station.  Route 35 runs every 30 minutes due to the short route.  However, it does not provide all-day service, as it ends service around 10am and starting back up at 2:30 pm and running up to 8 pm.  Route 16 was also split into two routes.  The new route 16 provides service between Brookside & Nevada and 19th/Uintah.  A new route, Route 17, was created to more directly service the Uintah Gardens shopping center and the westside.  This route provides service between the Cache La Poudre transfer point and the Fillmore transfer point.

Also, 15-minute service saw an expansion with this service change, with route 9 being rerouted to Nevada Avenue between the Downtown Terminal and Jackson St, along with a new route, Route 19 that provides service along the same streets as route 9, but remains on Nevada north of Mount View Lane and terminates at Nevada and Eagle Rock, near the UCCS 4-Diamonds sports area.  Route 19 runs every 30 minutes during weekdays and hourly on Saturdays, providing 15 minute weekday service and 30-minute Saturday service between the Downtown Terminal and Mount View Lane.  Routes 10 and 11 got a frequency increase to 30 minutes to provide 15-minute weekday service between the Downtown Terminal and Southgate Road, and to the PPCC Transfer Station, where the two routes terminate.  Route 10 also regained Saturday service for the first time since the 2010 service cuts, which allowed 30-minute service between the Downtown Terminal and Southgate Road once again.

With Route 19 proving service to Nevada and Eagle Rock, Route 39 was shortened to end there and was interlined with route 19.  Since route 39 ran evening service on weekdays, it was necessary to add weekday evening trips on route 19 to allow service between Eagle Rock and the Downtown Terminal.  Since Route 9 also ran weekday evening service, route 19 weekday evening trips still arrived and departed from the Downtown Terminal at 30 minutes after the hour.

On September 18, 2016, a few changes were made.  Route 4 began running weekday evening and Sunday service.  Route 5 was restructured to run on Wahsatch Avenue instead of Weber between the Downtown Terminal and Boulder St.  Route 6 gained an additional outbound trip to the Citadel Mall.  Routes 7 and 27 saw a frequency increase to 30 minutes on Saturdays.  Route 12 began service an hour earlier on Saturdays, allowing riders to catch the first inbound bus to the Downtown Terminal.  Route 19 was rerouted to Weber between Cache La Poudre and Jackson.  Route 39's weekday schedule was changed so it would allow Route 19 to provide better connections at the Downtown Terminal on weekday evenings.  Route 39 gained Saturday service as well. Route 35 saw an increase in the number of trips in the morning, with the mid-day service interruption being reduced to between 11:30 am and 2:30 pm.

In January 2017, new proposed changes for 2017 were released.  Route 25 is proposed to get a frequency increase to 15 minutes on weekdays.  Since additional buses are needed to provide the frequency increase and won't arrive until the summer, this change won't take place until the first week of October.  Routes 23, 25, and 27 are proposed for minor scheduling changes to improve on-time performance.  Route 6 is proposed to remain on Fillmore all the way to Union instead of deviating to 4th St between El Paso and Hancock.  This change, if approved, will not take place until the infrastructure to provide safe and reliable two-way service on Fillmore between El Paso and Hancock is done, which would be around the fall of 2018 at the earliest.

Fares 
Under 6 with fare-paying rider can board for free; up to 3.

(*- May require proof of eligibility to be eligible for reduced fare.)

References 

Bus transportation in Colorado
Transportation in Colorado Springs, Colorado
Transit agencies in Colorado